Shelf life is the length of time that a commodity may be stored without becoming unfit for use, consumption, or sale. In other words, it might refer to whether a commodity should no longer be on a pantry shelf (unfit for use), or no longer on a supermarket shelf (unfit for sale, but not yet unfit for use). It applies to cosmetics, foods and beverages, medical devices, medicines, explosives, pharmaceutical drugs, chemicals, tyres, batteries, and many other perishable items. In some regions, an advisory best before, mandatory use by or freshness date is required on packaged perishable foods. The concept of expiration date is related but legally distinct in some jurisdictions.

Background

Shelf life is the recommended maximum time for which products or fresh (harvested) produce can be stored, during which the defined quality of a specified proportion of the goods remains acceptable under expected (or specified) conditions of distribution, storage and display.

According to the United States Department of Agriculture (USDA), "canned foods are safe indefinitely as long as they are not exposed to freezing temperatures, or temperatures above 90 °F (32.2° C)". If the cans look okay, they are safe to use. Discard cans that are dented, rusted, or swollen. High-acid canned foods (tomatoes, fruits) will keep their best quality for 12 to 18 months; low-acid canned foods (meats, vegetables) for 2 to 5 years.

"Sell by date" is a less ambiguous term for what is often referred to as an "expiration date". Most food is still edible after the expiration date. A product that has passed its shelf life might still be safe, but quality is no longer guaranteed. In most food stores, waste is minimized by using stock rotation, which involves moving products with the earliest sell by date from the warehouse to the sales area, and then to the front of the shelf, so that most shoppers will pick them up first and thus they are likely to be sold before the end of their shelf life. Some stores can be fined for selling out of date products; most if not all would have to mark such products down as wasted, resulting in a financial loss.

Shelf life depends on the degradation mechanism of the specific product. Most can be influenced by several factors: exposure to light, heat, moisture, transmission of gases, mechanical stresses, and contamination by things such as micro-organisms. Product quality is often mathematically modelled around a parameter (concentration of a chemical compound, a microbiological index, or moisture content).

For some foods, health issues are important in determining shelf life. Bacterial contaminants are ubiquitous, and foods left unused too long will often be contaminated by substantial amounts of bacterial colonies and become dangerous to eat, leading to food poisoning. However, shelf life alone is not an accurate indicator of how long the food can safely be stored. For example, pasteurized milk can remain fresh for five days after its sell-by date if it is refrigerated properly. However, improper storage of milk may result in bacterial contamination or spoilage before the expiration date.

The expiration date of pharmaceuticals specifies the date the manufacturer guarantees the full potency and safety of a drug. Most medications continue to be effective and safe for a time after the expiration date. A rare exception is a case of renal tubular acidosis purportedly caused by expired tetracycline. A study conducted by the U.S. Food and Drug Administration covered over 100 drugs, prescription and over-the-counter. The study showed that about 90% of them were safe and effective as long as 15 years past their expiration dates. Joel Davis, a former FDA expiration-date compliance chief, said that with a handful of exceptions - notably nitroglycerin, insulin and some liquid antibiotics - most expired drugs are probably effective.

Shelf life is not significantly studied during drug development, and drug manufacturers have economic and liability incentives to specify shorter shelf lives so that consumers are encouraged to discard and repurchase products. One major exception is the Shelf Life Extension Program (SLEP) of the U.S. Department of Defense (DoD), which commissioned a major study of drug efficacy from the FDA starting in the mid-1980s. One criticism is that the U.S. Food and Drug Administration (FDA) refused to issue guidelines based on SLEP research for normal marketing of pharmaceuticals even though the FDA performed the study. The SLEP and FDA signed a memorandum that scientific data could not be shared with the public, public health departments, other government agencies, and drug manufacturers. State and local programs are not permitted to participate. The failure to share data has caused foreign governments to refuse donations of expired medications. One exception occurred during the 2010 Swine Flu Epidemic when the FDA authorized expired Tamiflu based on SLEP Data. The SLEP discovered that drugs such as Cipro remained effective nine years after their shelf life, and, as a cost-saving measure, the US military routinely uses a wide range of SLEP tested products past their official shelf life if drugs have been stored properly.

Preservatives and antioxidants may be incorporated into some food and drug products to extend their shelf life. Some companies use induction sealing and vacuum/oxygen-barrier pouches to assist in the extension of the shelf life of their products where oxygen causes the loss.

The DoD Shelf-Life Program defines shelf-life as

The total period of time beginning with the date of manufacture, date of cure (for elastomeric and rubber products only), date of assembly, or date of pack (subsistence only), and terminated by the date by which an item must be used (expiration date) or subjected to inspection, test, restoration, or disposal action; or after inspection/laboratory test/restorative action that an item may remain in the combined wholesale (including manufacture's) and retail storage systems and still be suitable for issue or use by the end user. Shelf-life is not to be confused with service-life (defined as, A general term used to quantify the average or standard life expectancy of an item or equipment while in use.  When a shelf-life item is unpacked and introduced to mission requirements, installed into intended application, or merely left in storage, placed in pre-expended bins, or held as bench stock, shelf-life management stops and service life begins.)

Shelf life is often specified in conjunction with a specific product, package, and distribution system.

Temperature control

Nearly all chemical reactions can occur at normal temperatures (although different reactions proceed at different rates). However most reactions are accelerated by high temperatures, and the degradation of foods and pharmaceuticals is no exception. The same applies to the breakdown of many chemical explosives into more unstable compounds. Nitroglycerine is notorious. Old explosives are thus more dangerous (i.e. liable to be triggered to explode by very small disturbances, even trivial jiggling) than more recently manufactured explosives. Rubber products also degrade as sulphur bonds induced during vulcanization revert; this is why old rubber bands and other rubber products soften and get crispy, and lose their elasticity as they age.

The often quoted rule of thumb is that chemical reactions double their rate for each temperature increase of  because activation energy barriers are more easily surmounted at higher temperatures. However, as with many rules of thumb, there are many caveats and exceptions. The rule works best for reactions with activation energy values around 50 kJ/mole; many of these are important at the usual temperatures we encounter. It is often applied in shelf life estimation, sometimes wrongly. This is mathematically incorrect (if the rule was precisely accurate the required temperature increase would be about ), and in any case the rule is only a rough approximation and cannot always be relied on. Chemists often use the more comprehensive Arrhenius equation for better estimations.

The same is true, up to a point, of the chemical reactions of living things. They are usually catalyzed by enzymes which change reaction rates, but with no variation in catalytic action, the rule of thumb is still mostly applicable. In the case of bacteria and fungi, the reactions needed to feed and reproduce speed up at higher temperatures, up to the point that the proteins and other compounds in their cells themselves begin to break down, or denature, so quickly that they cannot be replaced. This is why high temperatures kill bacteria and other micro-organisms: 'tissue' breakdown reactions reach such rates that they cannot be compensated for and the cell dies. On the other hand, 'elevated' temperatures short of these result in increased growth and reproduction; if the organism is harmful, perhaps to dangerous levels.

Just as temperature increases speed up reactions, temperature decreases reduce them. Therefore, to make explosives stable for longer periods, or to keep rubber bands springy, or to force bacteria to slow down their growth, they can be cooled. That is why shelf life is generally extended by temperature control: (refrigeration, insulated shipping containers, controlled cold chain, etc.) and why some medicines and foods must be refrigerated. Since such storing of such goods is temporal in nature and shelf life is dependent on the temperature controlled environment, they are also referred to as cargo even when in special storage to emphasize the inherent time-temperature sensitivity matrix.

Temperature data loggers and time temperature indicators can record the temperature history of a shipment to help estimate their remaining shelf life.

According to the USDA, "foods kept frozen continuously are safe indefinitely."

Packaging
Passive barrier packaging can often help control or extend shelf life by blocking the transmission of deleterious substances, like moisture or oxygen, across the barrier.  Active packaging, on the other hand, employs the use of substances that scavenge, capture, or otherwise render harmless deleterious substances.  When moisture content is a mechanism for product degradation, packaging with a low moisture vapor transmission rate and the use of desiccants help keep the moisture in the package within acceptable limits.   When oxidation is the primary concern, packaging with a low oxygen transmission rate and the use of oxygen absorbers can help extend the shelf life. Produce and other products with respiration often require packaging with controlled barrier properties. The use of a modified atmosphere in the package can extend the shelf life for some products.

Issues associated with sell by / use by dates
According to the UK Waste & Resources Action Programme (WRAP), 33% of all food produced is wasted along the cold chain or by the consumer.  At the same time, a large number of people get sick every year due to spoiled food. According to the WHO and CDC, every year in the USA there are 76 million foodborne illnesses, leading to 325,000 hospitalizations and 5,000 deaths.

According to former UK minister Hilary Benn, the use by date and sell-by dates are old technologies that are outdated and should be replaced by other solutions or disposed of altogether. The UK government's Department for Environment, Food and Rural Affairs revised guidance in 2011 to exclude the use of sell-by dates. The guidance was prepared in consultation with the food industry, consumer groups, regulators, and Waste & Resources Action Programme (WRAP). It aims to reduce the annual £12bn of wasted supermarket food.

Regulation

Canada

The Canadian Food Inspection Agency produces a  Guide to Food Labelling and Advertising which sets out a "Durable Life Date". The authority for producing the guide comes from the Food and Drugs Act. The guide sets out what items must be labelled and the format of the date. The month and day must be included and the year if it is felt necessary and must be in the format year/month/day. However, there is no requirement that the year be in four digits.

European Union
In the EU food quality dates are governed by Regulation (EU) 1169/2011, "On the Provision of Food Information to Consumers".

Germany
In Germany, practices differentiate between the "Mindesthaltbarkeitsdatum" (MHD), roughly minimum shelf-life and "Verbrauchsdatum", which is more in line with the common expiry date. Products that spoil quickly, such as minced meat, have to be given a Verbrauchsdatum and are barred from sale upon expiry. Other products are given Mindesthaltbarkeitsdatum, which is set by the individual producers of said product and do not bar the product from being sold past the date determined. Products with an expired MHD may be sold if the seller is satisfied that the goods are in perfect condition. Accordingly, it follows that the customer is not entitled to compensation if he unintentionally acquires a product with an expired shelf life, provided that the product can still be regarded as faultless. Neither the MHD nor the Verbrauchsdatum provide legal rights if a product is no longer fit for consumption before the indicated date and the manufacturer can prove the credibility of his claims.

The MHD has been criticized for possibly causing food waste. For example, the then Minister Christian Schmidt complained that many still edible foods with an expired MHD would be thrown away by consumers who would misunderstand the MHD as an expiration date.

Hong Kong
In Hong Kong,  prepackaged food which from the microbiological point of view is highly perishable and is therefore likely after a short period to constitute an immediate danger to human health, are required to use the 'Use by' label instead of the 'Best before' label. Examples include pasteurised fresh milk,  packed egg and ham sandwiches, etc. Dates are usually presented in the DD MM YY (or YYYY) format.

United Kingdom
According to the Department for Environment, Food and Rural Affairs, dates must be in the day/month or day/month/year format. Technical expertise should be hired for regular end of shelf life safety and quality testing. Shelf life trials should be conducted using the same ingredients, equipment, procedures and manufacturing environment as will be used during the actual production.

United States
Sale of expired food products, per se, is lightly regulated in the US.  Some states restrict or forbid the sale of expired products, require expiration dates on all perishable products, or both, while other states do not. However, sale of contaminated food is generally illegal, and may result in product liability litigation if consumption of the food results in injury.

After losing a lawsuit, pharmacy chain CVS implemented a system that causes its registers to recognize expired products and avert their sale.

Voluntary industry guidelines announced in 2017 from the Grocery Manufacturers Association and the Food Marketing Institute recommend using only "best if used by" or "use by", to avoid confusion that leads to food waste.  In 2019, the Food and Drug Administration urged food manufacturers to adopt the voluntary standards.

Federal regulation
The Food and Drug Administration, which regulates packaged foods and drugs, only requires a use-by, or expiration, date on infant formula and some baby foods, because formula must contain a certain quantity of each nutrient as described on the label.  If formula is stored too long, it may lose its nutritional value.

The United States Department of Agriculture (USDA), which regulates fresh poultry and meats, only requires labeling of the date when poultry is packed. However, many manufacturers also voluntarily add sell-by or use-by dates.

The DoD Shelf-Life Program operates under the DoD Regulation 4140.1-R, DoD Material Management Regulation,
      A.  There are items in the Department of Defense (DoD) and the Federal Supply System that require special handling due to certain  deteriorative characteristics. These items are to be properly maintained to ensure that the customer is provided fresh, useable material. The purpose of this Manual is to establish a shelf-life program and process, with special emphasis on those items having these known deterioration characteristics, to mitigate the risk of shelf-life expiration and lapses of shelf-life items/material beyond their inspect/test dates.

      B.  Provide policy and basic procedures for the management of both non-consumable and consumable shelf‑life items that may be hazardous material (HAZMAT) or non-hazardous material, spanning all classes of supply and stored at all levels of the Federal Supply System. Shelf-life management for hazardous material follows the same procedures as those for any shelf-life items, except that hazardous material should receive priority processing over non-hazardous material. Issues and guidelines concerning the acquisition, storage, handling, transportation, and disposal of hazardous material are addressed in Chapters 3 and 5 of this Manual. Class I perishable subsistence, Class III bulk petroleum, Class V ammunition, and Class VIII-B blood, are excluded from this Manual and shall continue to be managed in accordance with existing regulations. Commodities excluded from this Manual may be represented by their respective DoD Component to the DoD Shelf-Life Board. The definitions for “classes of supply” may be found in Appendix 16 of DoD 4140.1-R.

     C.  This Manual endorses the pollution prevention measures in DoD Instruction 4715.4 for hazardous material (HAZMAT) minimization (HAZMIN), as well as, the establishment of hazardous material control and management (HMC&M) philosophies which include consolidation and reutilization practices that embrace HAZMIN and HAZMAT elimination to reduce the hazardous waste (HW) stream.

     D.  Appendices A through K augment this Manual and furnish additional information germane to the DoD Shelf-Life Management Program.  Appendix L serves as a quick reference index to this Manual.

Beer

Freshness date
A freshness date is the date used in the American brewing industry to indicate either the date the beer was bottled or the date before which the beer should be consumed.

Beer is perishable. It can be affected by light, air, or the action of bacteria.  Although beer is not legally mandated in the United States to have a shelf life, freshness dates serve much the same purpose and are used as a marketing tool.

Beginnings of freshness dating
General Brewing Company of San Francisco marketed their Lucky Lager Beer as "Age Dated" as early as late 1935. They stamped a date on each can lid to indicate that the beer was brewed before that date. This was not to ensure that the beer was "fresh" but to ensure that it had been aged properly.  So many breweries had rushed beer to market before it was ready when Prohibition ended, that customers were wary of getting "green" beer.
The Boston Beer Company, maker of Samuel Adams, was among the first contemporary brewers to start adding freshness dates to their product line in 1985.  For ten years there was a slow growth in  brewers adding freshness dates to their beer.  The practice grew in popularity after the Anheuser-Busch company's "Born-On dates" starting in 1996. Many other brewers have started adding freshness dates to their products, but there is no standard for what the date means.  For some companies, the date on the bottle or can will be the date that the beer was bottled; others have the date by which the beer should be consumed.

Related concepts
The concept of shelf life applies to other products besides food and drugs. Gasoline has a shelf life, although it is not normally necessary to display a sell-by date. Exceeding this time-frame will introduce harmful varnishes, etc. into equipment designed to operate with these products, i.e. a gasoline lawn mower that has not been properly winterized could incur damage that will prevent use in the spring, and require expensive servicing to the carburetor.

Some glues and adhesives also have a limited storage life, and will stop working in a reliable and usable manner if their safe shelf life is exceeded.

Rather different is the use of a time limit for the use of items like vouchers, gift certificates and pre-paid phone cards, so that after the displayed date the voucher etc. will no longer be valid. Bell Mobility and its parent company, BCE Inc. have been served with notice of a $100-million class-action lawsuit alleging that expiry dates on its pre-paid wireless services are illegal.

See also 

 Accelerated aging
 Cold chain
 Digital permanence
 Expiration date
 Failure rate
 Food waste
 Inventory turnover
 Modified atmosphere
Moisture sorption isotherm
 Moisture vapor transmission rate
 Packaging and labelling
 Permeation
 Planned obsolescence
 Redox
 Shelf stable

References

Further reading
   Includes a list of the many terms used in the United States food industry.
 Anonymous, "Cold Chain Management", 2003, 2006
 Anonymous, Protecting Perishable Foods During Transport by Truck , USDA Handbook 669, 1995
 Kilcast, D., Subramamiam, P., Food and Beverage Stability and Shelf Life, Woodhead Publishing, 2011, 
 Labuza, T. P., Szybist, L.,  Open dating of Foods, Food and Nutrition Press, 2001; other edition: Wiley-Blackwell, 2004, 
 Man, C. M., Jones. A. A., Shelf-Life Evaluation of Foods, 
 Robertson, G.L., Food Packaging and Shelf Life: A Practical Guide, CRC Press, 2010, 
 Steele, R., Understanding and Measuring the Shelf-Life of Food, Woodhead Publishing, 2004, 
 Weenen, H., Cadwallader, K., Freshness and Shelf Life of Foods, ACS, 2002,

External links

USDA - Food Product Dating and storage guidelines
FDA - Food freshness and smart packaging
How to store your food

Food safety
Packaging
Drug safety
Food retailing
Product expiration
Retail processes and techniques